Tom White (1 March 1866 - 5 July 1939) was a Scotland international rugby union player.

Rugby Union career

Amateur career

He was schooled at Edinburgh Academy.

He played for Edinburgh Academicals.

Provincial career

He played for Edinburgh District against Glasgow District in the inter-city match of 1887.

He played for East of Scotland District in their match against West of Scotland District in February 1888.

International career

He was capped three times for Scotland, in the period 1888 to 1889.

Business career

He worked on the P & O Shipping Line.

Military career

In the First World War he served with the Royal Navy.

Medical career

White went to Edinburgh University to study medicine. He graduated with a M. B. and C. M. in 1888. White became a surgeon, first at the County Hospital in Ayr, then started his own practice in Moffat as a G.P. in 1894. With the exception of the war years, the last 45 years of his life were spent in Moffat.

Other interests

White was a noted Freemason. He also like golf and curling.

Family

His father was Andrew White (1828-1879) and his mother was Janet Young (1831-1869). Andrew White was a solicitor and bank clerk in Cumnock. Tom was one of their 7 children.

He married Isabelle Constance Megret (1869-1942) in Edinburgh. They had one daughter Anita Louise White.

Death

His death was reported as 'sudden' and on the 5 July 1939 by the following day's The Scotsman newspaper.

References

1866 births
1939 deaths
Scottish rugby union players
Scotland international rugby union players
Edinburgh Academicals rugby union players
Edinburgh District (rugby union) players
East of Scotland District players
Rugby union players from East Ayrshire
People from Cumnock
Alumni of the University of Edinburgh
Royal Navy personnel of World War I
19th-century Scottish medical doctors
20th-century Scottish medical doctors
Rugby union forwards